Ernesto Ramel (born 15 March 1934) is a Filipino wrestler. He competed in the men's freestyle bantamweight at the 1956 Summer Olympics.

References

External links
 

1934 births
Living people
Filipino male sport wrestlers
Olympic wrestlers of the Philippines
Wrestlers at the 1956 Summer Olympics
Place of birth missing (living people)